Silvania may refer to:

 Silvania, Brazil, a municipality in southcentral Goiás state, Brazil
 Silvania, Colombia, a town and municipality in Cundinamarca Department, Colombia
 Silvania County, a designation for Sălaj County, Romania
 Silvania National College, a college in Transylvanian city of Zalău, Romania
 69th Mixed Artillery Brigade Silvania, a military unit of the Romanian Army
 FC Silvania, a football club from Șimleu Silvaniei, Romania
 Acanthophila silvania, a moth from the family of Gelechiidae

See also
 Sylvania (disambiguation)